The 1908–09 season was the 17th in the history of the Western Football League.

For the last time, Division One was split into two sections of six clubs, reorganised from the previous season, with the winner of each section playing each other in a Championship decider. Brighton & Hove Albion won Section A and reigning champions Millwall won Section B, with Millwall winning the decider 2–1 in a replay after the first match was drawn. At the end of this season, all 14 clubs in Division One resigned from the League, leaving Division Two as the only division in the league. All the member clubs of Division One also competed in the Southern League during this season. As with the previous season, the Division Two champions were Bristol City Reserves.

Division One
One new club joined Division One, which remained at 14 clubs after Tottenham Hotspur left.
Croydon Common

Section A

Section B

Championship decider 
At the end of the season, the winners of the two sections played a match to decide the overall champions. For the first time, the match was drawn and a replay was arranged.

Division Two
Three new clubs joined Division Two, which was increased from nine to 12 clubs.
Aberdare
Barry District, joining from the South Wales League
Bath City

References

1908-09
1908–09 in English association football leagues